John Godkin Giles (May 17, 1834 – March 12, 1903) was an Ontario medical doctor and political figure. He represented Leeds South in the Legislative Assembly of Ontario as a Conservative member from 1873 to 1874.

Giles was born in Farmersville, near Napanee, Ontario, in 1834, one of ten children born to William Godkin Giles (1789–1867) and Sarah Richards (1791–1867). He was trained as a medical doctor and, on August 26, 1871, he was appointed as an Associate Coroner for the United Counties of Leeds and Grenville. He was married in Appleton, Ontario, on July 6, 1864, to Caroline (Carrie) Teskey (1840–1924) of Ramsay Township and they had one daughter.

Giles was elected in a by-election called when Herbert Stone MacDonald, the sitting Conservative MPP resigned to become a Judge. Giles served for only one year and his Legislative Service included membership on only one Standing Committee (Private Bills). In 1874, he was defeated for the Conservative nomination by Robert Henry Preston who went on to win in the general election held early the next year.

He died in Leeds County, Ontario, in 1903.

References

External links 
 

1834 births
Progressive Conservative Party of Ontario MPPs
1903 deaths